King of Women is a 1923 German silent comedy film directed by Jaap Speyer and starring Georg Alexander, Stella Arbenina, and Ralph Arthur Roberts.

The film's sets were designed by the art director Rudi Feld.

Cast
In alphabetical order

References

Bibliography

External links

1923 films
Films of the Weimar Republic
German silent feature films
Films directed by Jaap Speyer
1923 comedy films
German comedy films
German black-and-white films
Silent comedy films
1920s German films
1920s German-language films